The six  were a class of six light cruisers built for and operated by the Imperial Japanese Navy. The Nagara-class cruisers proved useful in combat operations ranging from the Aleutian Islands to the Indian Ocean throughout World War II. Most served as flagships for destroyer or submarine squadrons, and were deployed for transport or local defense missions. Towards the end of the war, the surviving vessels were increasingly obsolete and were retained as second-line units.

The Nagara class was followed by the very similar .

Background
A final three 5,500 ton class light cruisers authorized under the 8-4 Fleet Program were ordered by the Imperial Japanese Navy in 1920. Due to minor changes in design, primarily due to advances in torpedo technology, these three vessels were initially designated as "modified Kuma-class", or "5500-ton class Type II", before being re-designated after the lead vessel, . A second set of three vessels was authorized in late 1920. These final three vessels were initially to be named Suzuka, Otonase, and Minase until November 1921.

Design
The Nagara class was the second class of light cruisers in the Imperial Japanese Navy based on a standardized 5,500 ton displacement. In terms of dimensions and performance, it is almost identical to the previous s; however, it was the first class of cruisers to be equipped with the new  Type 93 Long Lance Torpedoes, which required a larger launcher.

The Nagara class used the same hull, engine, and armaments layout as the Kuma class. The Nagara-class hull design was based on a 5,500 ton nominal displacement, with a high freeboard and light bridge structure, behind which was a tripod mast with the fire control platform and two searchlights, the same as the Kuma class.

The propulsion system for the Nagara class was based on four axial deceleration turbines with 12 boilers, providing . Ten boilers were designed to burn heavy oil, and the remaining two burned a mixture of coal and oil.

The main battery consisted of seven 14 cm/50 3rd Year Type naval guns in individual gun turrets, (two fore, three after and one on either side of the bridge). The positioning meant that only six of the guns could be brought to bear in a broadside. As with the Kuma class, the Nagara class remained highly deficient in anti-aircraft protection, with only two 8 cm/40 3rd Year Type naval guns and two 6.5 mm machine guns. Provision was made for 48 naval mines.

A major difference from the Kuma class was in the configuration of the bridge, which incorporated an aircraft hangar. Initially, a  platform was mounted above the No.2 turret, extending over the forward superstructure below the bridge. This was later replaced by an aircraft catapult. Even so, the arrangement proved unwieldy, and the catapult was moved to the rear of each ship, between the No.5 and No.6 turrets during retrofits in 1929-1934.

In service modifications
Near the start of World War II, Abukuma and Kinu were scheduled to be fitted as flagships for destroyer squadrons, with the new Type 93 torpedoes. However, due to shortages, only Abukuma received the twin quadruple-mount launcher as planned, and her forward launchers were removed. After the start of the war, each of the vessels in the Nagara class  was modified and upgraded, especially to enhance anti-aircraft capabilities, but no two vessels were modified in the same way. 

To keep weight within design limits, the catapults were removed, and on almost all vessels, the No.5 and No.7 turrets were replaced by a twin-mount 12.7 cm/40 Type 89 naval gun and additional single and triple-mount Type 96 25 mm AA guns, wherever room permitted, supplemented by 13-mm machine guns.

From 1943-1944, the five surviving ships in the class received radar.

Isuzu was the only cruiser which underwent conversion into a dedicated anti-aircraft/anti-submarine cruiser. From May–September 1944, all of her main guns were removed and replaced by a total of three Type 89 twin-mounted anti-aircraft guns, with a Type 94 fire-control system added to the foremast. Her Type 96 25 mm AA guns were increased to a total of 11 triple-mounts and 17 single-mounts. Her torpedo launchers were replaced by two quadruple launchers mounted in the stern, along with two depth charge rails. She was given a complete set of the latest radar, hydrophones and sonar.

Ships in class
Six vessels were built in the Nagara class. None survived the Pacific War.


 Built by the Sasebo Naval Arsenal and commissioned on 22 April 1922, Nagara served in the initial battles of the Second Sino-Japanese War, including the Battle of Shanghai and the Invasion of French Indochina. After the attack on Pearl Harbor, Nagara covered the landings of Japanese troops in Malaya and the Dutch East Indies. She accompanied Admiral Nagumo's Carrier Striking Force during the Battle of Midway, at the end of which she took over from the destroyer  as the flagship of Admiral Nagumo after the loss of his flagship . Afterwards, she participated in the battles of the Eastern Solomons, Santa Cruz , and the Naval Battle of Guadalcanal (where she is credited with sinking the destroyer ). She was sunk by the submarine  en route between Kagoshima and Sasebo on 7 August 1944.

 Built by the Uraga Dock Company, and commissioned on 15 August 1923, Isuzu covered the landings of Japanese troops in China, and the seizure of Hong Kong in early World War II. Afterwards assigned to the Dutch East Indies, during the Solomon Islands campaign she was active at the Battle of Santa Cruz and Naval Battle of Guadalcanal. Suffering severe damage in air attacks in late 1943, she was forced to return to Japan, where she underwent an extensive conversion into an anti-aircraft/anti-submarine cruiser. She survived the Battle of Leyte Gulf, but was sunk by a wolfpack of four submarines (three American and one British) off Sumbawa on 7 April 1945.

Completed by Mitsubishi Nagasaki on 15 September 1922, Natori covered the landings of Japanese troops in the Philippines and the Dutch East Indies. Subsequently assigned to patrols in the Dutch East Indies, she returned to Japan to repair damage from air attack in June 1943, and was only able to resume duties in April 1944. She was sunk off Samar by the submarine  on 19 August 1944.

 Commissioned at Sasebo Naval Arsenal on 20 March 1923, Yura was involved in the sinking of Prince of Wales and Repulse, and covered the landings of Japanese troops in Malaya and Sarawak. Afterwards, she participated in the Indian Ocean raid, the Battle of Midway, and the Battle of the Eastern Solomons. She was fatally damaged by United States Navy and United States Army Air Forces aircraft in the Solomon Islands and scuttled on 25 October 1942.

 Completed at Kawasaki Shipbuilding Corporation in Kobe on 10 November 1922, Kinu was involved in the sinking of Prince of Wales and Repulse, and covered the landings of Japanese troops in Malaya and the Dutch East Indies. She was involved in various operations in the Solomon Islands and the Philippines, but was sunk by U.S. Navy aircraft in the Visayan Sea on 26 October 1944.

 Completed by the Uraga Dock Company on 26 May 1925, Abukuma took part in the attack on Pearl Harbor. She was later involved in the Battle of the Komandorski Islands, and remained active in northern waters under the IJN 5th Fleet until October 1944, However, when sent south to counter the American invasion of the Philippines, she was severely damaged by an American PT boat at the Battle of Surigao Strait on 25 October, and a subsequent attack by American land-based bombers fatally damaged her, causing her to be scuttled on 26 October 1944.

References

Notes

Books

External links

Cruiser classes